The 222d Command and Control Squadron (222 CACS) is an Air National Guard command and control squadron located at Rome, New York and Chantilly, Virginia.

Mission 
222 CACS provides the National Reconnaissance Office's (NRO) National Reconnaissance Office Operations Center (NOC) with augmentees to assist NRO and U.S. Space Command during times of need.  222 CACS provides support with ongoing space operations crucial to our national security.  The NRO is a joint organization engaged in the research and development, acquisition, launch and operation of overhead reconnaissance systems necessary to meet the needs of the Intelligence Community and Department of Defense.

History

Emblem 
Ultramarine blue and Air Force yellow are the Air Force colors. Blue alludes to the sky, the primary theater of Air Force operations. Yellow refers to the sun and the excellence required of Air Force personnel. The stars symbolize the unit ties to the Air Force Space Command. The orbiting satellite represents the unit's connection to space and the National Reconnaissance Office. The satellite represents local heritage and culture. The profile of the Minuteman symbolizes the connection to the Air National Guard and the unit's rapid response capability. Emblem approved 13 March 2009.

Previous designations 
 222d Command and Control Squadron (13 Nov 2008 – Present)

Assignments

Major Command/Gaining Command 
Air National Guard/Air Force Space Command (13 Nov 2008 – Present)

Locations 
 Rome, New York/Chantilly, Virginia (13 Nov 2008 – Present)

Photo gallery

See also 
National Reconnaissance Operations Center (NROC)

References 

Command and control squadrons of the United States Air Force
Military units and formations in New York (state)
Military units and formations in Virginia
Command and Control 0222